Pixies is an 2015 animated fantasy feature film released by Arcana Studio. It is based on the 2012 graphic novel of the same name. Pixies is written, produced and directed by Sean O'Reilly, the author of the graphic novel, who was nominated for the 2016 Leo Awards for best Direction in an Animation Program for his work on the film.

Synopsis
Joe Beck has lost the love of his life thanks to a Pixie's Curse and he now needs to figure out how to get his girl back, learn more about the mysterious Pixies and undo a bad deed he did long ago.

Cast
 Alexa PenaVega as Michelle Meyers
 Christopher Plummer as Pixie King, Samuel and William's Father
 Bill Paxton as Eddie Beck
 Carlos Pena Jr. as William, a black haired Pixie who warns Sam to be nicer to his best friends Twitch and Max
 Geoff Gustafson as Samuel, a brown-haired green-eyed male pixie who wants to go with Daisy to the Glowworm Trail
 Alison Wandzura as Gail Meyers
 David Milchard as Pixie Page
 Kiefer O'Reilly as Worker Pixie
 Sean Patrick O'Reilly as Joe Beck
 Eric Pollins as Henry Meyers / Old Man Tom / Vincent
 Summer O'Reilly as Daisy

Awards
 2016 Leo Awards Nomination - Best Direction in an Animation Program

References

External links
 

2015 animated films
2015 films
2012 graphic novels
Animated films based on comics
Canadian animated feature films
Films based on Canadian comics
Films directed by Sean Patrick O'Reilly
2010s English-language films
2010s Canadian films